Orlando Fuentes (born November 19, 1974) is an American judoka. He competed in the men's half-lightweight event at the 1996 Summer Olympics.

References

1974 births
Living people
American male judoka
Olympic judoka of the United States
Judoka at the 1996 Summer Olympics
Place of birth missing (living people)